Promenades St-Bruno (corporately known as CF Promenades St-Bruno) is a two-level shopping mall located in Saint-Bruno-de-Montarville, Quebec, Canada. Ground was broken in the spring of 1977 to build the mall and it was completed in August 1978. Les Promenades St-Bruno is the largest mall in the Montérégie and part of its consumer base come from cities as far as Saint-Hyacinthe and Sorel-Tracy. The anchor tenants are The Bay and Simons.

The Bay is the only one left among the five initial anchors, although it moved into the space that was vacated by Simpsons in 1989, with its original location being converted into a mall expansion in 1991. Aside from The Bay, the 1978 anchors were Simpsons, Miracle Mart, Steinberg's and Eaton's.

History
Steinberg's, through Ivanhoe, had owned 25% of the mall and also operated a Miracle Mart store side by side to the supermarket. The latter was renamed to M in August 1986. Both businesses closed in 1992. It was announced that Zellers would open by November 1993 in the space formerly used by Steinberg's and the M store. Zellers left the mall in 2012 and American giant retailer Target occupied its space from 2013 to 2015. After five years of unoccupancy, the former Target location got transformed into a 130,000 square foot public market named "CF Marché des Promenades" consisting of 40 tenants including a  grocery store of 35,000 square feet.

Hudson's Bay Company closed its Simpsons location at Promenades St-Bruno in early 1989. The existing The Bay store relocated in Simpsons' vacant space on June 22, 1989. The Bay's original location stayed vacant for over a year. A new mall wing was created with 57 shops which opened during the spring of 1991 anchored by a Sears store that inaugurated on April 3. Sears closed on January 14, 2018. The space that Sears occupied was dismantled to welcome a relocating Sports Experts, Winners and Imaginaire. On May 1, 2019, Sports Expers/Atmosphere left its previous location above Simons to relocate on the second floor of the former Sears store. Winners opened on September 10, 2019, in the first floor of Sears. Imaginaire, a retail chain from Quebec City, opened its first Greater Montreal location during the fall of 2019, using 15,000 square feet of the former Sears.

During the 1990s, big box stores arrived around the mall, which continued well into the 2000s. While some of these stores (e.g., Best Buy, Old Navy) are tenants of Promenades St-Bruno, the majority of them have no relation to the mall.

Simons picked the first floor of former Eaton's in 2001. Sport Experts/Atmosphere and five boutiques took over the second floor of Eaton's. Simons doubled its size in 2021 by expanding on the second floor formerly occupied by Sports Experts. The exterior of Simons at Promenades Saint-Bruno has always been two-story high ever since the store's inception  in 2001 and as such it was believed that the facade would stay the same after the expansion. In reality, a large portion of the facade  went from beige to black when the store added its second floor although the middle of the storefront, which includes the Simon's name, remained intact.

The original major tenants were Eaton's (130,000 sq ft), Simpsons (135,000 sq ft), The Bay (125,000 sq ft), Miracle Mart, (130,000 sq ft) and Steinberg's (50,000 sq ft). Les Promenades St-Bruno was the first shopping centre in Canada to house at the same time the three upscale department stores: Simpsons, The Bay and Eaton's. At 900,000 square feet upon inauguration, it was the second largest mall among all of Cadillac Fairview's properties across the country in 1978, surpassed at the time only by fellow Quebec shopping centre Galeries d'Anjou. Concomitantly, Les Promenades Saint-Bruno was the second largest mall among all shopping centres in the Montreal area. Although now wholly owned by Cadillac Fairview, Les Promenades Saint-Bruno was originally the joint property at 51% of the aforementioned company, 24.5% of Ivanhoe Corporation and 24.5% of Eaton's. The mall was developed by Cadillac Fairview at $45 million and opened on August 23, 1978, with 170 stores. Its history dates back to 1968 when Steinberg's Ivanhoe Corporation purchased the 200 acres site at the corner of Autoroute 30 and Route 116 in St-Bruno. Eaton's became co-owner in the early 1970s and Fairview Corporation (a predecessor of Cadillac Fairview) followed suit in 1973.

A deadly mid-air collision occurred above the Promenades St-Bruno on March 17, 2017, with the wreckage of one of the planes landing on the roof of the mall and the other on its parking lot.

See also
List of largest enclosed shopping malls in Canada
List of malls in Montreal
List of shopping malls in Canada

Note

References

External links

Eaton's
Saint-Bruno-de-Montarville
Shopping malls established in 1978
Shopping malls in Quebec
Tourist attractions in Montérégie
Buildings and structures in Montérégie
Cadillac Fairview